Petrache is a Romanian surname and masculine given name. Notable people with the surname include:

Alin Petrache (born 1976), Romanian rugby union administrator and former player
Eugen Petrache (born 1945), Romanian rower
Iulian Petrache (born 1991), Romanian footballer

and with the given name:

Petrache Lupu
Petrache Poenaru

Romanian-language surnames
Romanian masculine given names